Proarrhythmia is a new or more frequent occurrence of pre-existing arrhythmias, paradoxically precipitated by antiarrhythmic therapy, which means it is a side effect associated with the administration of some existing antiarrhythmic drugs, as well as drugs for other indications.  In other words, it is a tendency of antiarrhythmic drugs to facilitate emergence of new arrhythmias.

Types of proarrhythmia
According to the Vaughan Williams classification (VW) of antiarrhythmic drugs, there are 3 main types of Proarrhythmia during treatment with various antiarrhythmic drugs for Atrial Fibrillation or Atrial flutter:

Ventricular proarrhythmia
 Torsades de pointes (VW type IA and type III drugs)
 Sustained monomorphic ventricular tachycardia (usually VW type IC drugs)
 Sustained polymorphic ventricular tachycardia/ventricular fibrillation without long QT (VW types IA, IC, and III drugs)

Atrial proarrhythmia
 Conversion of atrial fibrillation to flutter (usually VW type IC drugs or amiodarone).  May be a desired effect.
 Increase of defibrillation threshold (a potential problem with VW type IC drugs)
 Provocation of recurrence (probably VW types IA, IC and III drugs).  It is rare.

Abnormalities of conduction or impulse formation
 Sinus node dysfunction, atrioventricular block (almost all drugs)
 Accelerate conduction over accessory pathway (digoxin, intravenous verapamil, or diltiazem)
 Acceleration of ventricular rate during atrial fibrillation (VW type IA and type IC drugs).

Increased risk
 Presence of structural heart disease, especially LV systolic dysfunction.
 Class IC agents.
 Increased age.
 Females.

Clinical pointers

Class IA drugs
 Dose independent, occurring at normal levels.
 Follow QT interval, keep ms.

Class IC drugs
 May be provoked by increased heart rate.
 Exercise stress tests after loading.

Class III drugs
 Dose dependent.
 Follow bradycardia, prolonged QT closely.

References

External links
 

Symptoms and signs
Medical terminology
Cardiac arrhythmia